Al Bahiyah is a small village near the coast in the Lahij Governorate of south-western Yemen. It is located 54.4 km east by road from Hisn Murad.

References

Populated places in Lahij Governorate
Populated coastal places in Yemen